Veľké Dvorany is a municipality in the Topoľčany District of the Nitra Region, Slovakia. In 2011 it had 696 inhabitants.

References

External links
http://en.e-obce.sk/obec/velkedvorany/velke-dvorany.html

Villages and municipalities in Topoľčany District